The Five Articles of Remonstrance or the Remonstrance were theological propositions advanced in 1610 by followers of Jacobus Arminius who had died in 1609, in disagreement with interpretations of the teaching of John Calvin then current in the Dutch Reformed Church.  Those who supported them were called "Remonstrants".

Background
Forty-six preachers and the two leaders of the Leyden state college for the education of preachers met in The Hague on 14 January 1610, to state in written form their views concerning all disputed doctrines. The document in the form of a remonstrance was drawn up by Jan Uytenbogaert and after a few changes was endorsed and signed by all in July.

The Remonstrants did not reject confession and catechism, but did not acknowledge them as permanent and unchangeable canons of faith. They ascribed authority only to the word of God in Holy Scripture and were averse to all formalism. They also maintained that the secular authorities have the right to interfere in theological disputes to preserve peace and prevent schisms in the Church.

The Remonstrants' Five Articles of Remonstrance was met with a response written primarily by Festus Hommius, called The Counter-Remonstrance of 1611. The Counter-Remonstrance of 1611 defended the Belgic Confession against theological criticisms from the followers of late Jacob Arminius, although Arminius himself claimed adherence to the Belgic Confession and Heidelberg Catechism till his death.

Finally, the Five Articles of Remonstrance were subject to review by the Dutch National Synod held in Dordrecht in 1618–19 (see the Synod of Dort). The judgements of the Synod, known as the Canons of Dort (Dordrecht), opposed the Remonstrance with Five Heads of Doctrine, with each one set as an answer to one of the five Articles of the Remonstrance. It was this response which gave rise to what has since become known as the Five Points of Calvinism. Modified to form the acrostic TULIP they covered the soteriological topics within Calvinism, summarizing the essence of what they believe constitutes an orthodox view on each of the following points:
 Total depravity : the sin that we are bound to
 Unconditional election : the basis of God's choice of the saved
 Limited atonement : the application of the benefits of the atonement
 Irresistible grace : how the Holy Spirit brings man to repentance and faith
 Perseverance of the saints : the assurance that the saints will bring forth the fruits of the Spirit.

The five articles

Article 1 – Conditional election
This article rejects the concept that election into Christ is unconditional. Rather, this article asserts that election is conditional upon faith in Christ, and that God elects to salvation those He knows beforehand will have faith in Him.

Article 2 – Unlimited atonement
This article rejects the concept of limited atonement, which asserts that Christ only died for those God chooses to be saved. This article asserts that Christ died for all, but that salvation is limited to those who believe in Christ.

Article 3 – Total depravity
This article affirms the total depravity of man, that man is unable to do the will of God, and cannot save himself, apart from the grace of God.

Article 4 – Prevenient grace
This article rejects the concept of irresistible grace, contending that mankind has the free will to resist to the prevenient grace of God.

Article 5 – Conditional preservation of the saints
This article rather than outright rejecting the notion of perseverance of the saints, argues that it may be conditional upon the believer remaining in Christ.  The writers explicitly stated that they were not sure on this point, and that further study was needed. 

Sometime between 1610, and the official proceeding of the Synod of Dort (1618), the Remonstrants became fully persuaded in their minds that the Scriptures taught that a true believer was capable of falling away from faith and perishing eternally as an unbeliever. They formalized their views in "The Opinion of the Remonstrants" (1618), and later in Remonstrant Confession (1621).

Notes and references

Citations

Sources

Further reading 

1610 works
Arminianism
Calvinism in the Dutch Republic
Jacobus Arminius
Philosophy and thought in the Dutch Republic
Salvation in Protestantism
Works of the Dutch Golden Age